Paul Thorsen Harildstad   (23 December 1764 – 15 January 1843) was a Norwegian farmer who served as a representative at the Norwegian Constitutional Assembly at Eidsvoll in 1814.

Biography
Paul Thorsen (Pål Torsson)  was born on the farm Søre Harildstad in the parish of Heidal in Oppland, Norway. He was the seventh of eight children born to a farming family in the Gudbrand Valley. Paul Thorsen was married in 1792 with Rønnaug Larsdotter from the parish of Vågå.  The couple lived on the farm Åmodt near the village of Kvam at Nord-Fron  in Nord-Trøndelag where they raised their family of three sons.

He was commissioned as an officer in 1788 and participated in the campaign against Sweden  1808–1809.  He participated in the Battle of Toverud in Aurskog during 1808 and was awarded the Order of the Dannebrog for bravery. He represented the Oppland Infantry Regiment (Oplandske Infanteriregiment) at the Norwegian Constituent Assembly together with Diderich Hegermann, Commander of the regiment. Both representatives were supporters of the independence party (Selvstendighetspartiet).

See also
Dano-Swedish War of 1808–09

References

Related Reading
Holme Jørn (2014) De kom fra alle kanter - Eidsvollsmennene og deres hus  (Oslo: Cappelen Damm) 
Engen, Arnfinn (2012) Gards- og slekthistorie for Heidal  (Lillehammer: Bruket forlag)

External links
Representantene på Eidsvoll 1814 (Cappelen Damm AS)
 Men of Eidsvoll (eidsvollsmenn)
Biography of Paul Thorsen Harildstad

1764 births
1843 deaths
People from Sel
Fathers of the Constitution of Norway
Norwegian Army personnel
Norwegian military personnel of the Napoleonic Wars
Order of the Dannebrog